Chen Yanchong (born 10 April 1987), is a WTA professional women's tennis player from the People's Republic of China. She was born in Hengyang, Hunan province in China.

A member of the Chinese Olympic team in 2003, Chen is the best tennis player of the Guangdong team, with a ranking of the 14th best Chinese player overall.

Her highest WTA singles ranking is 187, which she reached on 6 November 2006. Her career high in doubles is 157, which she reached on 6 November 2006. Chen has won 3 ITF singles title and 4 doubles titles.

Career statistics

Singles finals: 5 (3–2)

Doubles finals: 8 (4–4)

See also 
Chinese tennis players
Tennis in China

References

External links
 
 

1987 births
Living people
Chinese female tennis players
Sportspeople from Guangzhou
Tennis players from Guangdong